Boys' football tournament has been a regular Asian Youth Games sporting event since the first Asian Youth Games in 2009 edition, while girl's tournament not yet.

Age limit is under-14, same as the age limit in football competitions at the Youth Olympics. Although Kazakhstan is a member of the Olympic Council of Asia (OCA), the football team has been a member of the UEFA since 2002. The same rule applies to the Guam and Australia who are members of the AFC, but they are members of Oceania National Olympic Committees (ONOC).

South Korea is the only nation have won gold medals in Asian Youth Games.

Result

Medal

Participating nations
P = Preliminary
GS = Group Stage
QF = Quarter Final
4th = Fourth Place
3rd = Bronze Medal
2nd = Silver Medal
1st = Gold Medal
W = Withdrawn

See also
Football at the Asian Games
Beach soccer at the Asian Beach Games
Futsal at the Asian Indoor and Martial Arts Games

References

External links
Official website
Official website

Football
Asian Youth Games